Restless Heart is the ninth studio album by English hard rock band Whitesnake, released by EMI on 26 March 1997 in Japan and 26 May in Europe. It was produced by the band's vocalist David Coverdale, and originally conceived as a solo album. However, Coverdale was pressured into releasing the record under the moniker "David Coverdale & Whitesnake" by EMI. Musically Restless Heart features a more subdued sound compared to Whitesnake's previous two albums. It is also the only full-length Whitesnake studio album to feature guitarist Adrian Vandenberg throughout, despite being a member of the group since 1987.

The album received a mixed response from music critics, and only reached number 34 in the group's native UK. In total, Restless Heart charted in ten countries. With Whitesnake having been dropped by Geffen Records in 1994, Restless Heart did not receive a North American release, being available only as an import. The album's supporting tour was billed as Whitesnake's farewell tour, although the band would later reform in 2003. Restless Heart was reissued by Rhino Entertainment in 2021, featuring remastered and remixed versions of the album, among other previously unreleased material.

Background 
After completing the Liquor & Poker World Tour in September 1990, vocalist David Coverdale elected to put Whitesnake on hold, wanting to take a break from the music industry. He eventually began writing songs again with Whitesnake guitarist Adrian Vandenberg, but their sessions broke down after Vandenberg allegedly presented Coverdale with songs "more suited to Chicago or Poison". In 1993, Coverdale released an album with Led Zeppelin guitarist Jimmy Page. The collaboration came to an abrupt end, however, in December 1993 after only a few live shows. Coverdale then contacted Vandenberg about resuming their writing sessions. In early 1994, Coverdale was approached with the idea of possibly performing in Russia. He agreed and soon began planning a full European tour with a session band backing him. However, EMI and Geffen Records released Whitesnake's Greatest Hits in July 1994. Thus, Coverdale was asked by EMI to tour as Whitesnake instead. Though initially reluctant, he agreed with Vandenberg joining him as well. After the tour ended later that year, Whitesnake were dropped by Geffen Records, leaving the band without a North American record deal. Keen on establishing himself as a solo artist outside of Whitesnake, Coverdale resumed his writing sessions with Vandenberg on what was to be a David Coverdale solo album.

Production and composition 
Recording sessions for the album began in 1995 in Reno, Nevada, where Coverdale was living at the time. In the studio, Coverdale and Vandenberg were joined by bassist Guy Pratt, keyboardist Brett Tuggle and drummer Denny Carmassi, all of whom had performed on the Coverdale–Page tour. Carmassi had also been a member of Whitesnake on the Greatest Hits tour. Coverdale produced the album himself, with Bjorn Thorsrud acting as engineer. The album was then mixed by Mike Shipley, and mastered by Eddie Schreyer. Restless Heart marked the first time Adrian Vandenberg had played on a full-length Whitesnake album throughout, despite being a member of the group since 1987. While he is minimally featured on 1989's Slip of the Tongue, majority of the guitar parts were recorded by Steve Vai.

Music and lyrics 
The sound of Restless Heart has been characterised by music critics as mellower and more blues-influenced than Whitesnake's previous two studio albums. Music journalist and author Martin Popoff characterised the record as "variously poppy, bluesy, rootsy, but still often heavy rockin’". Metal Hammers Andreas Schöwe also noted an influence of soul on some of the tracks. A number of Coverdale's unused ideas for a second Coverdale–Page album were reappropriated for Restless Heart, namely on the songs "Woman Trouble Blues" and "Take Me Back Again". "Too Many Tears" was originally conceived during Coverdale and Vandenberg's first writing sessions before the Coverdale–Page project. The initial version was described by Coverdale as an "old Stax soul tune", but the song was later reworked into a blues number. Lyrically, the album's title-track explores Coverdale's mindset during Slip of the Tongue and its accompanying tour, when he became worn out "trying to fulfil everybody else's expectations". "Crying" has drawn comparisons to Led Zeppelin from several music critics.

Release and promotion 
As the record was being finished, new higher-ups at EMI flew to Reno for a listening session. Afterwards they informed Coverdale that they wanted the album to be released under the Whitesnake moniker. Coverdale objected, feeling that the record was stylistically too different from the band. However, Coverdale's contract with EMI referred to him as "David Coverdale, known as the artist Whitesnake", thus he was contractually obligated to comply. It was at Denny Carmassi's suggestion that Coverdale decided to compromise and agreed to release the album under the moniker "David Coverdale & Whitesnake". As a result, the guitars and drums on the album were brought up in the mix in order to bring the album closer to Whitesnake's sound. Coverdale later expressed disappointment over this decision.

Restless Heart was released on 26 March 1997 in Japan, and 26 May in Europe. It peaked at number 34 on the UK Albums Chart, and spent a total of three weeks on the chart. Overall, the album charted in ten countries. Its highest chart position was in Sweden, where it reached number five. The album also cracked the top ten in Finland and Japan. As Whitesnake had been dropped by Geffen Records in 1994, Restless Heart did not receive a North American release, being available only as an import. "Too Many Tears" and "Don't Fade Away" were released as singles from the album, with the former peaking at number 46 on the UK Singles Chart. Music videos were produced for both tracks, directed by Russell Young. The video for "Too Many Tears" also featured future Whitesnake member Marco Mendoza on bass.

The supporting tour for Restless Heart was billed as Whitesnake's farewell tour as Coverdale wanted to explore other forms of music outside of hard rock. For the tour, Pratt and Tuggle were replaced by Tony Franklin and Derek Hilland, respectively, while Steve Farris was recruited as a second guitarist. During a promotional trip to Japan in July 1997, Coverdale and Vandenberg were asked by Toshiba EMI to perform an acoustic set of songs. This performance was later released as Starkers in Tokyo. The Restless Heart World Tour began in September 1997, and ended that December in South America.

Restless Heart was reissued by Rhino Entertainment on 29 October 2021 as a multi-disc box set, featuring remastered and remixed versions of the album, as well as previously unreleased demos and outtakes. The collection also includes music videos and interviews about the making of the album. Current Whitesnake guitarist Joel Hoekstra and former Dream Theater keyboardist Derek Sherinian recorded additional parts for the remixed version of the record. Additional percussion and backing vocals were provided by Christopher Collier, who also remixed the album. Some of the remixed songs had previously been included on a series of compilation albums, collectively titled the "Red, White and Blues" trilogy, which were released between 2020 and 2021.

Critical reception 

Contemporary review for Restless Heart were mixed. Rock Hard described the album as "nice but harmless", and "a tired exit" as potentially the last Whitesnake album. Metal Hammers Andreas Schöwe commented positively on the record's more "finely nuanced vocal parts", though he stated that some listeners may be weary of the album's softer sound compared to Whitesnake's previous releases. Nonetheless, he gave the album a score of five out of seven. Paul Elliott of Q magazine was lukewarm on the record, and gave it two stars out of five.

Retrospective reviews for the album have remained mixed. AllMusic's Greg Prato commended Coverdale for not trying to change Whitesnake's sound to fit then-current trends. He concluded his review by stating that "longtime Whitesnake fans will be pleased" with the record, awarding three stars out of five. Jerry Ewing, writing for Classic Rock, described Restless Heart as a "curio" in the band's discography, falling somewhere between a Whitesnake album and a David Coverdale solo record. He ultimately deemed this the album's greatest weakness, not being one thing nor the other. Nevertheless, he still commented positively on many of the songs. In a separate piece, Classic Rocks Neil Jeffries ranked Restless Heart second-to-last in David Coverdale's overall studio discography, describing the songs as either "limp ballads" or "derivative rockers". Reviewing the 2021 remix, Malcolm Dome, also for Classic Rock, stated that Restless Heart is "better than history has painted it". He also noted how the remix improved many of the songs.

Track listing 
All songs written by David Coverdale and Adrian Vandenberg, except where noted.

Personnel 
Credits are adapted from the album's liner notes.

Charts

Album

Singles

References

Footnotes

Book sources

External links 

David Coverdale albums
Whitesnake albums
1997 albums
EMI Records albums
Hard rock albums by English artists
Blues rock albums by English artists
Rhino Entertainment albums